Ron Ellis (born September 18, 1968) is a retired American basketball player.  He was a standout college player at Louisiana Tech University, a second round NBA Draft pick and played professionally for 15 years.

College career
Ellis, a 6'7" power forward from Rayville, Louisiana, played collegiately for Tyler Junior College and Louisiana Tech.  As a senior in the 1991–92 season, Ellis averaged 15.7 points and 7.7 rebounds per game and was named Sun Belt Conference Player of the Year.

Professional career
Following the close of his college career, Ellis was drafted in the second round of the 1992 NBA Draft (49th pick overall) by the Phoenix Suns, however he did not play in the league.  He spent the 1992–93 season in the Continental Basketball Association, averaging 11.3 points and 5.5 rebounds per game for the Fort Wayne Fury and Rochester Renegade.  He played briefly in Greece and for several years in Belgium (mostly for Spirou Charleroi), ultimately obtaining Belgian citizenship.

References

External links
College stats
eurobasket.net profile

1968 births
Living people
American expatriate basketball people in Belgium
American expatriate basketball people in Greece
American men's basketball players
Antwerp Giants players
Basketball players from Louisiana
Belgian men's basketball players
Belgian people of American descent
Fort Wayne Fury players
Iraklis Thessaloniki B.C. players
Liège Basket players
Louisiana Tech Bulldogs basketball players
Phoenix Suns draft picks
Power forwards (basketball)
Rochester Renegade players
Spirou Charleroi players
Sportspeople from Monroe, Louisiana
Tyler Apaches men's basketball players